Thompson House may refer to:

in Canada
 Thompson House (Montreal), a residence in the historic Îlot-Trafalgar-Gleneagles block in Montreal
 Thomson House, a former mansion in Montreal, now the graduate students building at McGill University

in Thailand
Jim Thompson House, a museum in Bangkok

in the United States
 N.Q. and Virginia M. Thompson House, Citronelle, Alabama
 Glenn-Thompson Plantation, Pittsview, Alabama, listed on the NRHP in Alabama
 Thompson House (Stevens Creek, Arkansas), listed on the NRHP in Arkansas
 Thompson Ranch, Cottonwood, Arizona
 Thompson, Boyce, Southwestern Arboretum, Superior, Arizona, listed on the NRHP in Arizona
 C. E. Thompson General Store and House, Arkadelphia, Arkansas, listed on the NRHP in Arkansas
 Henry-Thompson House, Bentonville, Arkansas, listed on the NRHP in Arkansas
 Ada Thompson Memorial Home, Little Rock, Arkansas, listed on the NRHP in Arkansas
 William H. Thompson Farmstead, East Windsor, Connecticut, listed on the NRHP in Connecticut
 Jewett-Thompson House, Fort Myers, Florida
 Gaylord Thompson House, Lewiston, Idaho, listed on the NRHP in Idaho
 James S. Thompson House, New Boston, Illinois, listed on the NRHP in Illinois
 Anderson-Thompson House, Indianapolis, Indiana, listed on the NRHP in Indiana
 William N. Thompson House, Indianapolis, Indiana, listed on the NRHP in Indiana
 Dr. George W. Thompson House, Winamac, Indiana, listed on the NRHP in Indiana
 Charles J. Thompson House, Forest City, Iowa, listed on the NRHP in Iowa
 Sen. William H. Thompson House, Garden City, Kansas, listed on the NRHP in Kansas
 Tobias-Thompson Complex, Geneseo, Kansas
 Thompson House (Eminence, Kentucky), listed on the NRHP in Kentucky
 James Thompson House (Anchorage, Kentucky)
 Sutfield-Thompson House, Harrodsburg, Kentucky, listed on the NRHP in Kentucky
 Thompson, Smith, Log House, Lancaster, Kentucky, listed on the NRHP in Kentucky
 John Henry Thompson House, Millersburg, Kentucky, listed on the NRHP in Kentucky
 John T. Thompson House, Newport, Kentucky
 William Thompson House (Perryville, Kentucky), listed on the NRHP in Kentucky
 Dr. Thompson House, Springfield, Kentucky, listed on the NRHP in Kentucky
 Thompson House (Jackson, Louisiana), listed on the NRHP in Louisiana
 Thompson Icehouse, South Bristol, Maine, listed on the NRHP in Maine
 Abijah Thompson House, Winchester, Massachusetts
 Johnson-Thompson House, Winchester, Massachusetts
 Benjamin Thompson House, Woburn, Massachusetts
 Thompson Home, Detroit, Michigan
 Gamaliel Thompson House, Hudson, Michigan
 Hannah C. and Peter E. Thompson House, Barnesville, Minnesota, listed on the NRHP in Minnesota
 Thompson-Fasbender House, Hastings, Minnesota
 Thompson Summer House, Minnetonka Beach, Minnesota
 James Young Thompson House, Amory, Mississippi, listed on the NRHP in Mississippi
 Lampton-Thompson-Bourne House, Columbia, Mississippi, listed on the NRHP in Mississippi
 June and Nora Thompson House, New Hebron, Mississippi, listed on the NRHP in Mississippi
 George Thompson House, Pascagoula, Mississippi, listed on the NRHP in Mississippi
 Thompson-Campbell Farmstead, Langdon, Missouri, listed on the NRHP in Missouri
 Thompson-Brown-Sandusky House, St. Joseph, Missouri, listed on the NRHP in Missouri
 Thompson Hall, Durham, New Hampshire, listed on the NRHP in New Hampshire
 David Thompson House, Mendham, New Jersey, listed on the NRHP in New Jersey
 Thompson, Daniel, and Ryle, John, Houses, Paterson, New Jersey, listed on the NRHP in New Jersey
 Thompson House (Woodbury, New Jersey)
 Alexander Thompson House, Crawford, New York
 Robert A. Thompson House, Crawford, New York
 Walter Thompson House and Carriage House, Philipstown, New York
 Andrew Thompson Farmstead, Pine Bush, New York
 Thompson House (Poughkeepsie, New York)
 Thompson House (Setauket, New York)
 Henry Dwight Thompson House, Westfield, New York
 W. B. Thompson Mansion, Yonkers, New York
 Cowper-Thompson House, Murfreesboro, North Carolina, listed on the NRHP in North Carolina
 Thompson, Alfred and Martha Jane, House and Williams Barn, New Hope, North Carolina, listed on the NRHP in North Carolina
 Long, James A. and Laura Thompson, House, Roxboro, North Carolina, listed on the NRHP in North Carolina
 James Monroe Thompson House, Saxapahaw, North Carolina, listed on the NRHP in North Carolina
 Ward-Applewhite-Thompson House, Stantonsburg, North Carolina, listed on the NRHP in North Carolina
 Thompson House (Wake Forest, North Carolina), listed on the NRHP in North Carolina
 Thompson-Builder House, Dublin P.O., Ohio, listed on the NRHP in Ohio
 Cassius Clark Thompson House, East Liverpool, Ohio
 Bailey-Thompson House, Georgetown, Ohio
 Thompson-Bullock House, Georgetown, Ohio, listed on the NRHP in Ohio
 Mother Thompson House, Hillsboro, Ohio, listed on the NRHP in Ohio
 Enoch Thompson House, Mount Vernon, Ohio, listed on the NRHP in Ohio
 Joseph M. Thompson House, Tahlequah, Oklahoma, listed on the NRHP in Oklahoma
 Clark Thompson House, Cascade Locks, Oregon, listed on the NRHP in Oregon
 Ries–Thompson House, Parkdale, Oregon, listed on the NRHP in Oregon
 John L. Thompson House, The Dalles, Oregon
 Thomas H. Thompson House, Brownsville, Pennsylvania
 Thayer-Thompson House, Erie, Pennsylvania
 S. R. Thompson House, New Wilmington, Pennsylvania, listed on the NRHP in Pennsylvania
 John Thompson House (Richboro, Pennsylvania)
 Gen. John Thompson House, State College, Pennsylvania
 Thompson Cottage, West Chester, Pennsylvania
 Thompson House (Springfield, South Dakota), listed on the NRHP in South Dakota
 William Thompson House (Camden, Tennessee)
 Thompson-Brown House, Maryville, Tennessee, listed on the NRHP in Tennessee
 Absalom Thompson House, Spring Hill, Tennessee, listed on the NRHP in Tennessee
 Billow-Thompson House, Cuero, Texas, listed on the NRHP in Texas
 Thompson House (McKinney, Texas), listed on the NRHP in Texas
 D. H. Thompson House, Waxahachie, Texas, listed on the NRHP in Texas
 Mary I. Thompson House, Beaver, Utah, listed on the NRHP in Utah
 W. O. Thompson House, Beaver, Utah, listed on the NRHP in Utah
 William Thompson House (Beaver, Utah), listed on the NRHP in Utah
 William Thompson, Jr., House, Beaver, Utah, listed on the NRHP in Utah
 Thompson-Hansen House, Brigham City, Utah, listed on the NRHP in Utah
 Thompson, Niels and Mary Ann Fitzgerald, House, Sandy, Utah, listed on the NRHP in Utah
 Dabney-Thompson House, Charlottesville, Virginia
 George Oscar Thompson House, Tazewell, Virginia
 Albert W. Thompson Hall, Pullman, Washington, listed on the NRHP in Washington
 Will H. Thompson House, Seattle, Washington, listed on the NRHP in Washington
 Thompson House Hotel, Baraboo, Wisconsin, listed on the NRHP in Wisconsin
 Erick J. Thompson House, New Richmond, Wisconsin
 Thomas Henry Thompson House, St. Croix Falls, Wisconsin

See also
James Thompson House (disambiguation)
John Thompson House (disambiguation)
William Thompson House (disambiguation)
Thompson Farm (disambiguation)
Thompson School (disambiguation)